Garrwa, also spelt Garawa, Gaarwa, or Karawa and also known as Leearrawa, is an Australian Aboriginal language spoken by the Garrwa people of a northern region of the Northern Territory of Australia.

Phonology

Vowels

Consonants

References

 Series B, no. 42.
Mushin, Ilana. 2012. A grammar of Garrwa. Berlin: de Gruyter.

External links
Garawa: Australian Aboriginal Language Data from the UQ Flint Archive

Garawan languages